Federal Route 18, or Jalan Iskandar Shah, is a main federal road in Manjung district, Perak, Malaysia. It is a main route to Pangkor Island. The road connects Sitiawan East to Lumut town.

Route background
The Kilometre Zero of the Federal Route 18 starts at Lumut. The Kilometre Zero monument is erected near Pos Malaysia post office at Jalan Sultan Yusuff Izuddin, Lumut.

Features
At most sections, the Federal Route 18 was built under the JKR R5 road standard, allowing maximum speed limit of up to 90 km/h.

List of junctions and towns

References

Malaysian Federal Roads